Isabella Plains is a suburb in the Canberra, Australia district of Tuggeranong. The postcode is 2905.  The suburb is indirectly named after Isabella Maria Brisbane (1821–1849), who was the daughter of Sir Thomas Brisbane, the colonial Governor of New South Wales when the area was first explored by white settlers in 1823. Joseph Wild was employed by Brigade Major John Ovens and Captain Mark Currie to guide them to the Murrumbidgee River. They travelled south along the river and named the area now known as Tuggeranong "Isabella's Plain". This name was adopted, with a slight change of spelling, for the name of the new suburb.  It was gazetted on 5 August 1975. Streets are named after New South Wales parish names.

It is next to the suburbs of Monash, Bonython, Richardson and Calwell. It is bounded by Isabella Drive, Drakeford Drive, Johnson Drive and Ashley Drive. Located in the suburb are a small group of shops, the senior campus of St Mary MacKillop College, Isabella Plains Primary School, the Tuggeranong automatic weather station and Isabella Plains neighbourhood oval.

Facilities

Shops
A small shopping centre is located on the corner of Ellerston Avenue and Galloway Street. This includes a small supermarket, a hairdresser, a Chinese restaurant, a pathology clinic, a chemist and a takeaway shop.
There is also an Isabella Plains Neighbourhood house, and a small doctors surgery opposite and to the right of the shops.

Schools
Government schools
 Isabella Plains Primary School, a P-2 school. Isabella Plains Primary School was changed from a full primary school to a Prep - Year 2 school in 2009, due to low population.

Isabella Plains residents get preference for:
Isabella Plains Early Childhood School
A shared Priority Enrollment Area (PEA) of Bonython Primary, Monash Primary, and Richardson Primary
Calwell High School
Lake Tuggeranong College

Non-government schools
 St Mary MacKillop College

Community facilities
An early childhood centre exists next to Isabella Plains Primary School on Ellerston Avenue, offering day care and children's health services. Since 2011 this has been run by Communities at Work. After school care is also available through Isabella Plains Primary School.

A Neighbourhood Centre shares a car park with the shops. This centre is available for general hire by the community and hosts, among other things, several daytime playgroups for mothers with young children in connection with the Playgroups Association.

Churches
 Isabella Plains is in the Catholic parish of Corpus Christi which has its church in Gowrie.

Gallery

Geology

Deakin Volcanics green grey and purple rhyodacite underlies the suburb.  These rocks are from the Silurian period. But it is overlaid by alluvium in the low-lying parts.

References

External links

https://web.archive.org/web/20080824051510/http://www.ga.gov.au/bin/gazm01?placename=Isabella%20Plains&placetype=R&state=ACT

Suburbs of Canberra